Jean-Pierre Dupuy (born February 20, 1941) is a French engineer and philosopher.

Biography
Dupuy attended the Ecole polytechnique, where he graduated in 1965 and attended the Ecole des Mines. He was a professor of French and a researcher at the Center for the Study of Language and Information (CSLI) of Stanford University, California. He also taught social and political philosophy and the ethics of science and technology until 2006 at the École Polytechnique.

He founded the center of cognitive sciences and epistemology of the Ecole polytechnique (CREA) in 1982 with Jean-Marie Domenach on the basis of preliminary reflections by Jean Ullmo. This center became a mixed research unit in 1987. From the outset, its vocation was two-fold and involved both modeling in human sciences (models of self-organization of complex systems) and the philosophy of science (in particular, the epistemology of cognitive sciences).

Awards
 2011 : prix Roger-Caillois 
 member of Académie des technologies and French Catholic Academy.
 Dupuy was inducted as an Academician into the International Academy for Systems and Cybernetic Sciences.

Work 
 With Hubert Lévy-Lambert, Les Choix économiques dans l'entreprise et dans l'administration, Dunod, 1973.  
 With Serge Karsenty, L'Invasion pharmaceutique, Seuil, « Points » 1977.
 « À la recherche du temps gagné », in Ivan Illich, Énergie et Équité, 1974.
 Valeur sociale et encombrement du temps, éditions du CNRS, 1975.
 With Jean Robert, La Trahison de l'opulence, Puf, 1976 .
 With Paul Dumouchel, L'Enfer des choses, Seuil, 1979 .
 Introduction à la critique de l'écologie politique, Civilizaçao Brasileira, Rio de Janeiro, 1980.
 Ordres et Désordres, enquête sur un nouveau paradigme, Seuil, 1982. .
 With Michel Deguy (dir.), René Girard et le Problème du mal, Grasset, 1982 .
 La Panique, Les Empêcheurs de Penser en Rond, 1991 .
 Le Sacrifice et l'Envie. Le libéralisme aux prises avec la justice sociale, Paris, Calmann-Lévy, 1992. 
– Réédition sous le titre Libéralisme et justice sociale, Hachette Pluriel .
 Introduction aux sciences sociales. Logique des phénomènes collectifs, Ellipses, 1992 . 
 Aux origines des sciences cognitives, La Découverte, 1994  (2005).
 Éthique et philosophie de l'action, Ellipses, 1999.
 Les savants croient-ils en leurs théories ? Une lecture philosophique de l'histoire des sciences cognitives, INRA Éditions, 2000.
 Avions-nous oublié le mal ? Penser la politique après le 11 septembre, Bayard, 2002 .
 Pour un catastrophisme éclairé. Quand l'impossible est certain, Seuil, 2004 .
 Petite métaphysique des tsunamis, Seuil, 2005 .
 Retour de Tchernobyl. Journal d'un homme en colère, Seuil, 2006 .
 La Marque du sacré : essai sur une dénégation, Carnets nord, 2009 .
 Dans l'œil du cyclone – colloque de Cerisy, Carnets nord, 2009 .
 L'Avenir de l'économie : sortir de l'économystification, Flammarion, 2012 .
 La jalousie : Une géométrie du désir, Seuil, 2016 .

References

External links
L'auto-organisation: de la physique au politique / Colloque de Cerisy ; sous la dir. de Paul Dumouchel et Jean-Pierre Dupuy (1981)
 Henri Prévot, Pour un catastrophisme éclairé. Lecture notes.
 Diffusion des savoirs de l'ENS, Première série d'interventions sur l'Éthique. Audio resources online under Creative Commons license.Entretien vidéo].
 Sur son engagement pro-nucléaire: Bertrand Louart, Jean-Pierre Dupuy, un catastrophiste bien mal éclairé, 2011.
 Cybernetics Is An Antihumanism: Advanced Technologies and the Rebellion Against the Human Condition'', [http://metanexus.net/essay/h-cybernetics-antihumanism-advanced-technologies-and-rebellion-against-human-condition http://metanexus.net/essay/h-cybernetics-antihumanism-advanced-technologies-and-rebellion-against-human-condition, 2011.

1941 births
French industrial engineers
École Polytechnique alumni
20th-century French engineers
Living people
20th-century French philosophers
21st-century French philosophers
21st-century French engineers
French expatriates in the United States
Stanford University faculty
Mines Paris - PSL alumni
Academic staff of École Polytechnique